Enterovibrio pacificus is a Gram-negative, facultatively anaerobic and motile bacterium species from the genus of Enterovibrio which has been isolated from seawater from the South Pacific Gyre.

References 

Vibrionales
Bacteria described in 2016